Apa Dam is a dam in Konya Province, Turkey, built between 1958 and 1962.

See also
List of dams and reservoirs in Turkey

External links
DSI

Dams in Konya Province
Dams completed in 1962